Hi Performance FileSystem (HFS) is a file system used in the HP-UX operating system. It is a variant of the Unix File System.

References

External links 
http://www.osdata.com/system/logical/logical.htm

Disk file systems
Computer file systems
HP software